Vincenzo Caglioti (born 26 May 1902 – 1 December 1998) was an Italian chemist and Academician.

Career
He graduated in Chemistry at University of Naples Federico II and became professor at the University of Florence in 1936.
In 1938 became professor at University of Rome "La Sapienza, where he works until 1977.

He was member of the Accademia dei Lincei from 27 August 1947. In 1957 he received the National Prize for Chemistry.

He was president of the National Research Council of Italy from 1965 to 1972.

External links
 Voce "Vincenzo Caglioti" in AA.VV., Biografie e bibliografie degli Accademici Lincei, Roma, Acc. dei Lincei, 1976, p. 141-143.
 "Cagliòti, Vincenzo". In: Enciclopedia Biografica Universale, Vol. IV, Roma: Istituto dell'Enciclopedia Italiana-L'Espresso, 2007

1902 births
Italian chemists
Sapienza University of Rome
1998 deaths
University of Naples Federico II alumni